Giuseppe Mastinu (born 9 October 1991) is an Italian professional footballer who plays as a midfielder for Serie B club Pisa.

Club career
He made his professional debut in the Serie B for Spezia on 20 September 2016 in a game against Trapani.

On 29 January 2021, he signed a 2.5-year contract with Pisa.

References

External links
 

1991 births
People from Sassari
Footballers from Sardinia
Living people
Italian footballers
Arzachena Academy Costa Smeralda players
Olbia Calcio 1905 players
Spezia Calcio players
Pisa S.C. players
Serie A players
Serie B players
Association football forwards